Buddy's Theatre is an American animated short film, released and first shown in theaters on April 1, 1935. It is a Looney Tunes cartoon, featuring Buddy, the second star of the series. It was supervised by Ben Hardaway; and musical direction was by Norman Spencer.

Summary
The film opens at Buddy's movie theater, to which hundreds of eager moviegoers flock for tonight's triple feature. As Buddy distributes tickets, he excuses himself for a moment to answer the telephone; as he speaks, a small child ingests the entire roll of tickets, leaving Buddy to use the child as a disburser unit until Buddy is out of tickets. He closes the window, leaving the toddler alone on the edge; the child begins to cry, but Buddy quickly solves the problem by handing him a lollipop.

Buddy picks up several reels of film to take up to the projection room. Having happily surmounted several flights of stairs, he encounters difficulty in opening the door of the room. The force of his final, successful tug sends him sliding down the banister on the same path that he took upward. The film is tumbling as well. Luckily, Buddy reaches the floor first, and the reels pile up neatly into his waiting hands as he continues his slide on the ground level. Buddy, a movie in hand, crashes into a water fountain, and the reels fly out of his hand and behind him, piling up neatly once again. Undaunted, he picks them up.

Within the auditorium, one patron, sitting on the aisle, is continually annoyed by other patrons wishing to pass him and sit in the same row. Frustrated enough, he rips his mounted seat out of the ground and moves into the aisle. Before the main feature (a film starring Cookie and titled "The Chinchilla"), we see a newsreel. In Italy, Prime Minister "Mausoleum" (Benito Mussolini) has lowered the mandatory age for military service. In "Liverpill", England, an early business recovery was demonstrated as a national dollar day attracting thousands of shoppers. In "Yodel", Switzerland, the Swiss navy launches the nation's newest battle cruiser.

Back in the projection room, Buddy mends a broken film reel by hammering a staple into it. He places the reel in the projector and starts the film, this time an advertisement for "Attractions Coming". There is an obvious flaw with the positioning of the projector, which Buddy adjusts so that the screen displays "Coming Attractions," as it should. Apparently, this coming motion picture is "The Smash Hit of the Century (three years in the remaking)". "It's Gigantic!" announces the painted wings of an approaching plane. "It's Stupendous!" "It's Colossal!" "It's Super-Colossal!" "In fact," says a plane that falls, unceremoniously, to the earth, "it's almost mediocre." "Don't fail to see James Bagknee (James Cagney) in "Here Comes the Gravy." The advertisements and local snipes continue, and finally, we come to "The Chinchilla", the film within a film.

Cookie sits at a piano, playing "How High Can a Little Bird Fly?" when an ape comes through her window; the ape becomes trapped in the piano, Cookie flees, but as the beast comes to the window to continue the chase, we see that she is trapped, by her shirt, on a tree branch. Buddy is eager to save her. By a pulley device, he is able to switch the projection screen to a clothesline, on which hangs a pair of long underwear. The ape, fantastically transported, jumps to its entrapment. Buddy then takes an open film reel and hurls it from the room, into the movie theater itself. The reel catches onto a chandelier. Buddy then swings onto the screen, kicking the ape in the process, and disappears for a moment. He re-emerges with a wooden plank, with which he smacks the beast into the distance. When Buddy manually returns the movie screen to its place, his sweetheart still magically dangles from the same branch. Taking a step ladder, Buddy goes to rescue her, but falls forward onto the screen, collapsing it in the process. Buddy pops out from under the folds of the cloth, a bit dazed (and conspicuously without Cookie).

Edited version
The 12-second "Liverpill, England" newsreel highlight scene was removed on Nickelodeon airings beginning in 1988 due to its racial stereotypical theme.

The film reels and snipes
Some of the clips retain clips from various Buddy shorts. The title of the newsreel is "Passé News", an obvious parody of "Pathé News." The rooster, the company's mascot appears to yell a reused scream from "Buddy of the Apes" instead of clucks, as well as the "Liverpill" sequence which features a recycled scene from the same short. In the Coming Attractions segment, the "smash-hit of the century" clip features a reused clip from "Buddy's Bearcats", a spoof of Here Comes the Navy, featuring reused footage of a ship from Buddy the Gob, snipes are later advertised; with a 15 cent-15 features merchant, and upcoming features such as The Thin Man and Eight Girls in a Boat, both actual films, are also referenced in its snipe reel. Finally, Cookie's picture is produced by "Warmer Bros." (Warner Bros.) and "Phoney Vitamin" (Vitaphone) as a "rejected short subject" (a spoof of "selected short subject").

Dating discrepancy
This article's placement follows the chronology given in the article Looney Tunes and Merrie Melodies filmography (1929-1939); that article often conflicts on dates and order with the filmography appendix of Leonard Maltin's Of Mice and Magic. For more on this as it relates to those cartoons featuring Buddy, see the relevant section of the article on Buddy's Circus.

References

External links
 
 

1935 films
1935 animated films
1930s American animated films
1930s animated short films
American black-and-white films
Films scored by Norman Spencer (composer)
Films directed by Ben Hardaway
Buddy (Looney Tunes) films
Films set in a movie theatre
Films set in Italy
Films set in Switzerland
Looney Tunes shorts
Cultural depictions of Benito Mussolini
1930s English-language films